Anton Sergeyevich Belov (born 29 July 1986) is a Russian professional ice hockey defenceman. He is currently playing with Avangard Omsk in the Kontinental Hockey League (KHL). He has previously played with CSKA Moscow, SKA Saint Petersburg, Dynamo Moscow and played one season in the National Hockey League (NHL) with the Edmonton Oilers.

Playing career
Belov made his professional debut with CSKA Moscow of the Russia Elite League in the 2004–05 season. Belov would play four seasons for Moscow. From 2008 to 2013, Belov played for Avangard Omsk of the Kontinental Hockey League (KHL). Belov played five seasons for Omsk.

In 2013, Belov decided he wanted ply his trade in the NHL. On 30 May 2013, the Edmonton Oilers announced that they had signed Belov to a one-year entry-level contract. Belov made the team roster to begin the 2013–14 season. On 10 January 2014, Belov scored his first NHL goal against Jeff Zatkoff of the Pittsburgh Penguins. Despite his status as a top defenceman in the KHL, Belov was used in a depth role with the Oilers and finished the year with 7 points in 57 games.

On 16 April 2014, as an approaching free agent, Belov signed a lucrative four-year contract to return to the Russian KHL with SKA St. Petersburg.

Following a lone season with Dynamo Moscow in 2021–22, Belov returned to former club, Avangard Omsk, as a free agent in signing a one-year contract on 3 May 2022.

Career statistics

Regular season and playoffs

International

Awards and honors

References

External links

1986 births
Living people
Avangard Omsk players
HC CSKA Moscow players
HC Dynamo Moscow players
Edmonton Oilers players
Sportspeople from Ryazan
Ice hockey players at the 2014 Winter Olympics
Olympic ice hockey players of Russia
SKA Saint Petersburg players
Undrafted National Hockey League players
Russian ice hockey defencemen
Russian expatriate ice hockey people
Russian expatriate sportspeople in Canada